Gerald Bradshaw (24 October 1880 – 14 September 1955) was a British wrestler. He competed in the men's Greco-Roman middleweight at the 1908 Summer Olympics.

References

External links
 

1880 births
1955 deaths
British male sport wrestlers
Olympic wrestlers of Great Britain
Wrestlers at the 1908 Summer Olympics
Place of birth missing